The Ferrari 641 (also known as the Ferrari F1-90) was the Formula One racing car with which the Ferrari team competed in the 1990 Formula One World Championship. Driven by Alain Prost and Nigel Mansell, it won six Grands Prix.

Development
The 641 was a developed version of its predecessor, the 1989 Ferrari 640, designed by John Barnard. The updated 641 design was overseen by former McLaren designer Steve Nichols after Barnard left Ferrari to join the Benetton team, once the car's development was complete. The car was powered by a 3.5-litre V12 engine, first with the type 036, and later in San Marino with the updated 037. Despite its heavier engine, the 641 was among the best handling cars on the grid. Prost declared it the best car of the year.

The Ferrari 641 was also the first Formula One car to use an effective traction control system, which debuted at the 1990 Portuguese Grand Prix in Estoril; less than two years before a traction control system debuted on the eventually highly successful Williams FW14B. Ferrari technicians sat down on the Tuesday after the Italian GP on September 11, and developed a rudimentary traction control system, which debuted in Portugal less than two weeks later. The system was relatively simple and straightforward; using just some software and a wheel speed sensor.

Incorporating the semi-automatic gearbox developed during the previous season, the car was seen to be technically advanced. The aerodynamics were reworked and the chassis gave a slightly longer wheelbase than its predecessor. Nichols designed the car with Alain Prost’s smooth driving style in mind. Prost worked hard on improving the reliability of the gearbox and also worked behind the scenes to bring the whole Ferrari team closer together. A variable inlet trumpet system on the engine was tested throughout the season but did not become standard equipment.

Racing history 
Ferrari's major coup was signing reigning World Champion Prost from McLaren to partner Nigel Mansell. The car scored six wins in the 1990 season (Prost five, Mansell one).

Prost's development work helped the 641 chassis to be extremely fast and competitive, and he scored five wins, including a remarkable victory from 13th place on the grid in Mexico, and challenged his nemesis Ayrton Senna for the championship. In the same race, Mansell outfoxed Gerhard Berger with a daring passing move at the fearsome Peraltada corner. Although the car occasionally struggled in qualifying, it appeared to have the edge on the McLarens in race trim, particularly at high-speed circuits. At the British Grand Prix, Mansell dominated qualifying while Prost struggled. Feeling that Mansell's car was superior to his own, he convinced the team to switch the chassis before the race, which he won while Mansell retired and promptly announced his quitting the sport. However, the famous collision between Prost and Senna at the Japanese Grand Prix sealed the Drivers' Championship for Senna and the Constructors' Championship for McLaren. Prost finished runner-up in the championship and Mansell finished 5th and scored 1 win, including excellent performance in his last race for Ferrari at Adelaide, where he finished 2nd and almost won that race from Nelson Piquet and his Benetton-Ford. It would be another seven years before Ferrari would challenge for either championship again.

Aftermath

Top Gear 
Tiff Needell drove the 641 on Top Gear in 1995 in a segment where his co-host Jeremy Clarkson tested a Ferrari F50 and did a drag race against Needell in the 641 and some comparisons as well because the F50 road car is based on the 641.

In popular culture 
The Ferrari 641 was featured in Codemasters' F1 2019 as a DLC for the "Legends Edition", the 2011 video game  Test Drive: Ferrari Racing Legends, and Forza Motorsport 7.

Complete results
(key) (results in bold indicate pole position; results in italics indicate fastest lap)

Chassis log
The current locations of the 641 chassis are:
115 - Museum of Modern Art (USA)
116 - destroyed in testing
117 - Museo Ferrari (Italy)
118 - Private collection (Germany)
119 - Private collection (Switzerland)
120 - Private collection (Germany)
121 - Private collection (UK)

References

Other sources
 AUTOCOURSE 1990-91 by Alan Henry
 AUTOCOURSE 1991-92 by Alan Henry

641